In fairy tales, a true love's kiss is a motif and commonly used trope whereby a kiss from a "true love" possesses magical powers and holds significant importance.

History 
The phrase "true love's kiss" in storytelling is recorded as early as the 16th century. In William Shakespeare's Richard III, the title character uses the phrase "Bear her my true love's kiss" in act 4, scene 4.

In 1697, Mother Goose Tales, written by Charles Perrault, included the concept of a magical true love's kiss from the prince to awaken the princess from her 100-year slumber. The Brothers Grimm used the same motif in their adaptation of "Briar Rose."

Another early example of true love's kiss can be found in the Grimms' The True Bride, in which the heroine breaks the spell over her prince (an evil princess bewitched him to forget her) with true love's kiss.

In fiction 
The concept of 'true love's kiss' appears frequently in contemporary fairytale fantasy, including in various modern retellings of fairytales by Walt Disney Pictures.

 In contemporary adaptations of the tale of "Snow White", including the 1937 Disney animated film Snow White and the Seven Dwarfs, Snow White's curse of eternal sleep is broken by the love's first kiss of the prince.
 In contemporary adaptations of the fairy tale of Sleeping Beauty, including the 1959 Disney animated film Sleeping Beauty, Princess Aurora's curse of deep sleep (and the deep sleep across the entire kingdom) is broken by the true love's kiss of Prince Phillip. In the 2014 retelling in Maleficent, Aurora is revived by a kiss from Maleficent on the forehead, an indicator of her maternal love for her.
 In contemporary retellings of the fairy tale of "The Frog Prince", the frog's transformation to a prince is triggered by a princess kissing the frog.
 In contemporary versions of the tale of "The Little Mermaid", including the 1989 Disney animated film The Little Mermaid, Ariel must obtain true love's kiss from Prince Eric to remain human and break the spell cast by Ursula The Sea-Witch.
 In contemporary adaptations of the fairy tale of "La Belle et la Bête", including the 1991 Disney animated film Beauty and the Beast, the curse of the beast and his household is broken by the true love's kiss of Belle.
 In the Shrek franchise, true love's kiss plays an integral role in the story plots, and has the power to break curses and spells, restore Shrek and Princess Fiona to ogre and human form, and reverse alternate realities.
 In the 2007 film, Enchanted, true love's kiss possesses the only magic powerful enough to break the poisoned apple's curse. One of the songs in the film's soundtrack is also titled "True Love's Kiss".
 In the 2013 book series The School for Good and Evil and subsequent film adaptation, the concept of true love's kiss plays a role in the story as a central riddle, powerful plot device, and as a method to revive the dead.
 In the 2018 film Charming, Lenore brings Prince Charming back to life with true love's kiss.
 In the Once Upon a Time series, true love's kiss is a frequent motif throughout the storyline. For example, the Wicked Witch of the West shares true love's kiss with Hades, and Dorothy Gale share's true love's kiss with Little Red Riding Hood.

Criticism 
During the 21st century, the concept of "true love's kiss" has faced some criticism due to concerns around consent and depictions of kissing asleep persons. Some critics have associated the trope of "true love's kiss" with heteronormativity and traditional gender stereotypes.

References 

Literary archetypes
Literary motifs